Zubov, and its feminine form, Zubova, is a surname originating from the Russian word zub (tooth). Its transliteration variant is Zuboff.

Notable people with this surname include:

Alexey Zubov (1682-c. 1750), Russian etcher
Anastasiya Zubova (b. 1979), Russian long-distance runner
Andrey Zubov (b. 1952), Russian historian and political scientist
Fyodor Zubov (1615–1689), iconic painter whose works are featured in the Novodevichy Convent
Grigory Zubov (1910-1944), Soviet army officer and Hero of the Soviet Union
Hennady Zubov (b. 1977), Ukrainian footballer
Ilya Zubov (b. 1987), Russian ice hockey player
Ilya Zubov (officer) (b. 1923), Soviet army officer and Full Cavalier of the Order of Glory
Konstantin Zubov, theatrical actor who worked with Varvara Massalitinova
Mariya Zubova (1749–1799), Russian composer and concert singer
Nikolay Alexandrovich Zubov (1763–1805), Russian Count who planned to assassinate Tsar Paul of Russia
Nikolay Zubov (oceanologist) (1885-1960), Soviet oceanologist and Arctic explorer
Olga Zubova (b. 1993), Russian weightlifter
Pavel Zubov (b. 1988), Russian footballer
Platon Zubov (1767–1822), Russian politician and favourite of Catherine the Great
Pyotr Zubrov (1822–1873), Russian stage actor
Sergei Zubov (b. 1970), ice hockey player
Valerian Zubov (1771–1804), Russian general who led the Russian invasion of Persia in 1796
Varvara Zubova (b. 2002), Russian gymnast
Vasily Zubov (1900–1963), Russian science historian 

Russian-language surnames